The following lists events that happened during 1966 in Chile.

Incumbents
President of Chile: Eduardo Frei Montalva

Events

January
13 January - Archipiélago de  Juan Fernández National Park receive new names: Robinson Crusoe (formerly Mas a Tierra) and Alexander Selkirk (formerly Más Afuera)
16 January - At the initiative of Senator Salvador Allende, the 27 Latin American delegations decide to create OLAS (Latin American Solidarity Organization), which calls on the Latin American peoples to "make the Andes mountain range a gigantic tricontinental Sierra Maestra."

February
11 February - The seventh version of the Viña del Mar International Song Festival is held.

March
13 March - Through the publication of Law 16441, the department of Easter Island is created.

May
2 May - The newspaper La Estrella del Norte is founded in the city of Antofagasta.

July
12-22 July - The FIS Alpine World Ski Championships 1966 is held in the town of Portillo, 80 km east of the Los Andes..

August
29 August- The President of the Republic, Eduardo Frei Montalva, and the Secretary General of the United Nations, U Thant, inaugurate the ECLAC Building, headquarters of the Economic Commission for Latin America and the Caribbean, in the Vitacura Commune.

October
17 October - The earthquake of Lima and Callao (Peru) occurs, with a magnitude of 7.2 degrees on the Richter scale, which is perceived in the cities of Arica, Iquique, Antofagasta, Tocopilla and Calama.

November
10 November- The San Juan (Argentina) earthquake occurs, with a magnitude of 5.9 degrees on the Richter scale, which is felt in the cities of La Serena, Ovalle, Illapel, La Ligua and Los Andes.

December
1 December - The newspaper La Estrella de Iquique is founded.
28 December - The Taltal earthquake occurs. With a magnitude of 8.1 degrees on the Richter scale, the earthquake causes a tidal wave that could be seen from Lima (Peru) to Talcahuano. 6 people die and another 35 are injured.
English ruling in the arbitration for the Palena area.

Births
11 February – Daniel Muñoz
14 February – Francisco Melo
13 April – Ivo Basay
14 June – Nelson Cossio
17 July – Omar Barrientos
27 August – Mónica Pérez
22 September – Nelson Tapia
8 October – Felipe Camiroaga (d. 2011)
16 December – Álvaro Escobar

Deaths
date unknown – Juan Antonio Iribarren (b. 1885)

References 

 
Years of the 20th century in Chile
Chile